The East Bay River (also called the East River and historically known as The River Jordan or the Chester River) in Florida is a  river located in Santa Rosa and Okaloosa counties. It flows from east to west, forming near Hurlburt Field, and empties into the eastern portion of East Bay (Florida) near the towns Holley and Navarre. The river forms part of the southern boundary of Eglin Air Force Base.

There is one public boat launch ramp located on the river, along State Road 87 in Holley, near the outlet into Pensacola Bay.

Named tributaries include Arachno Creek, Alligator Creek, and Panther Creek.

The average discharge rate is 40 cubic feet per second.

References

Rivers of Florida
Bodies of water of Santa Rosa County, Florida
Bodies of water of Okaloosa County, Florida
Navarre, Florida